Ring of Fire is a 1961 Metrocolor drama film directed by Andrew L. Stone and starring David Janssen, Joyce Taylor and Frank Gorshin. The film was shot in Vernonia, Oregon and Wynoochee River, Washington, featuring footage from two real forest fires.  The title song was written and performed by Duane Eddy.

Plot
Deputy sheriff Steve Walsh and his partner encounter a trio of young people in Washington between Shelton and Aberdeen.  After being taken hostage when the girl, Bobbie, produces a gun, the two deputies are forced by their captors into rural Mason County forests as the group flees an ever-growing search party.  Bobbie later tries to seduce Walsh - twice her age - who resists. One of Her companions, Roy, tries to push Walsh off a cliff but plummets to his own death instead.

When the search party comes to Walsh's rescue, Frank, the other captor, accuses Walsh of improper relations with Bobbie, who is a minor. Before the matter can be resolved, all realize that Frank's carelessly tossed cigarette has set the forest ablaze, threatening the town.

Walsh leads an evacuation of the townspeople and herds them aboard a train that leads across a bridge to safety. Frank, trying to flee, falls from the trestle and is killed. Steve tells Bobbie that she is special to him and professes his love by kissing her.

Cast
 David Janssen as Sergeant Steve Walsh
 Joyce Taylor as Bobbie 'Skidoo' Adams
 Frank Gorshin as Frank Henderson
 Joel Marston as Deputy Joe Pringle
 Jim Johnson as Roy Anderson
 Ron Myron as Sheriff Tom Niles, Mason County
 Marshall Kent as Deputy
 Doodles Weaver as Mr. Hobart

See also
 List of American films of 1961

References

External links 
 
 
 

1961 films
1961 crime drama films
American crime drama films
Films directed by Andrew L. Stone
Films about wildfires
Films set in forests
Films set in Oregon
Films shot in Oregon
Films shot in Washington (state)
Metro-Goldwyn-Mayer films
1960s English-language films
1960s American films